Kawaski Trawick (1986 – 14 April 2019) was an African American personal trainer and dancer who was shot and killed on 14 April 2019 by police officers at his home in the Bronx, New York City.

Biography 
Trawick's family lived in Milledgeville, Georgia, about two hours southeast of Atlanta. His mother worked as a state prison guard
and would leave early for her job, so Trawick often prepared his three younger siblings for school, cooked and did the laundry. Trawick graduated from Atlanta Technical College in 2013. In 2016  he moved to New York City, wishing to start a dance studio. Trawick lived in a few places when he first moved to New York before moving in mid-2018 to Hill House in the Bronx. He had a history of mental health and drug issues. His neighbors at Hill House described him as "erratic", that he could be sweet and charming, but he would also walk through the hallways at all hours doing martial arts moves with his long stick which he once swung and broke a window with.

Killing 
On 14 April 2019 Trawick called 911 saying that he was locked out his house, where there was food cooking on the hob, and claimed there was a fire. Firefighters left after letting him back into his home. The police were called that evening by the apartment's superintendent and a security guard who said Trawick was annoying neighbors by banging on doors holding a serrated bread knife and a broomstick.

When NYPD officers Brendan Thompson and Herbert Davis approached his apartment, Davis knocked on his door, and when nobody answered, he knocked again and went on to open Trawick's front door. Trawick was found distressed, standing near his stove, and holding both the serrated knife and the broomstick, asking the officers repeatedly why they were in his home. The officers did not respond and asked him to put away his knife; Trawick in turn replied that he had a knife because he was cooking.

Officer Davis, Black and more experienced, repeatedly tried to stop his white and less experienced partner from using force and told him "We ain’t gonna tase him". He walked away to turn off a radio before turning to the officers and asking again why they were in his house. Officer Thompson tased Trawick, knocking him down, and dropped his taser. Trawick recovered enraged, screamed at the officers and ran towards them.

Davis again tried to stop his partner Thompson from using his gun and briefly pushed  his gun down, saying, "No, no — don't, don't, don't, don't, don't." Thompson, who no longer had a taser, fired against Trawick three times, paused for a moment, and then fired a final shot. Shortly after the officers closed the door to the apartment without checking on Trawick or offering medical attention.

Reactions 
Writing for Propublica, Eric Umansky, wrote that the officers could have tried to make a connection with Trawick, as the NYPD trains its officers to do, and answered his question about why they were there, that they could have decided to not use force, or that they could have waited for help, as one former NYPD detective told him, since department policy is to "isolate and contain" people in crisis.

Bronx District Attorney Darcel Clark said the death "painfully illustrates" the fact that "urgent changes are needed in police response to mental health crises". On 12 August 2020, Clark issued a public statement saying that the case calls for "a thoughtful review of police procedures and training techniques" but that "we do not find that the facts warrant a criminal prosecution." The decision was criticized by Trawick's family and sparked calls for the officers to be fired. Clark released separate body camera video clips depicting the moment when officers Thompson and Davis entered Trawick's apartment, and a month afterwards ProPublica published additional body camera footage, after the non-profit organization New York Lawyers for the Public Interest used a lawsuit to obtain it from the NYPD, showing a sergeant asking "Who’s hurt?" and two unidentified officers replying "Just a perp." State Attorney General Letitia James' office declared it would not take the case, citing an 2015 executive order.

His family and activists have urged for the Civilian Complaint Review Board, a civilian-led group investigating police misconduct, to begin a disciplinary trial that would fire the officers from their positions. New York City Public Advocate Jumaane Williams denounced the lack of disciplinary action and declared that the case represented a failure on the city's part to properly respond to mental health issues. Ileana Méndez-Peñate, a spokesperson for Communities United for Police Reform, declared that evidence showed that officers escalated the situation.

See also 
 Death of Layleen Polanco

References 

1986 births
2019 deaths
2019 controversies in the United States
2019 controversies
2019 in New York City
2010s in the Bronx
April 2019 events in the United States
African-American history in New York City
African-American-related controversies
Deaths by person in New York City
Filmed deaths in the United States
Filmed killings by law enforcement
Law enforcement controversies in the United States
New York City Police Department
African Americans shot dead by law enforcement officers in the United States